Oleksandr Rykun (born 6 May 1978) is a Ukrainian former footballer who played as a midfielder and current scout at Metalist Kharkiv.

His son Anton is also a player, a midfielder for FC Dnipro.

Career
Rykun started his career for FC Metalurh Novomoskovsk in 1995. He played there until 1997 when he transferred to Dnipro in 1997. In 1998, he transferred to FC Metalurh Mariupol where he played until 2003. He then transferred back to Dnipro. He debuted in the Vyscha Liha on 17 March 1998 against FC Chernomorets Odessa.
The best player of Ukrainian Premier League 2003-04.

Statistics
 Rykun played 71 matches for Dnipro and scored 10 goals.
 He played 114 matches for Mariupol and scored 29 goals.
 He played 8 matches for the Ukraine national football team.

External links
Profile of Oleksandr Rykun

 
 

1978 births
Living people
Footballers from Dnipro
Ukrainian footballers
Ukraine international footballers
Ukrainian Premier League players
Ukrainian Second League players
FC Metalurh Novomoskovsk players
FC Metalist Kharkiv players
FC Mariupol players
FC Dnipro players
FC Vorskla Poltava players
Association football midfielders